The Radisson Hotel Salt Lake City Downtown is a hotel in Salt Lake City, Utah, United States.

Description and history
The 381-room hotel in Downtown Salt Lake City underwent an approximately $7 million renovation in 2012. The 15-story building was completed in 1985 and was also renovated in 2019.

References

External links

 

1985 establishments in Utah
Buildings and structures completed in 1985
Buildings and structures in Salt Lake City
Hotels in Utah